Acts is the debut studio album by the American rock band RNDM.

Reception

Acts received mixed reviews from critics. On Metacritic, the album holds a score of 65/100 based on 4 reviews, indicating "generally favorable reviews."

Track listing
Modern Times - 3:06
Darkness - 4:15
The Disappearing Ones - 3:08
What You Can't Control - 5:45
Hollow Girl - 5:37
Walking Through New York - 4:04
Look Out! - 2:53
New Tracks - 3:13
Throw You to the Pack - 1:41
Williamsburg - 4:14
Letting Go of Will - 2:35
Cherries in the Snow - 4:37

Personnel
Jeff Ament - bass
Joseph Arthur - guitar, vocals
Richard Stuverud - drums

References

External links
Acts at Allmusic

2012 debut albums
RNDM albums
Monkeywrench Records albums